The Mysterious Monsieur Sylvain (French: Le mystérieux Monsieur Sylvain) is a 1947 French mystery film directed by Jean Stelli and starring Frank Villard, Simone Renant and Jean Chevrier.

It was shot at the Billancourt Studios in Paris with sets designed by the art director Emile Alex.

Synopsi
When an engineer at a naval base is murdered three different men turn up claiming to be Monsieur Sylvain, a detective assigned to the case.

Cast
 Frank Villard as Ancelin 
 Simone Renant as Françoise Dastier 
 Jean Chevrier as Chantenay 
 Jean Marchat as Morgat 
 Marcelle Praince as La marquise 
 André Bervil as Le tueur 
 Marcel Raine as Le commandant Dartois 
 Paul Amiot as Le colonel 
 Claude Nollier
 Suzanne Bara
 Roger Bontemps
 Max Doria
 Jacques Mattler
 Jacques Muller
 Roger Coirault
 Maud Lamy

References

Bibliography 
 Rège, Philippe. Encyclopedia of French Film Directors, Volume 1. Scarecrow Press, 2009.

External links 
 

1947 films
French mystery films
1947 mystery films
1940s French-language films
Films directed by Jean Stelli
Films shot at Billancourt Studios
French black-and-white films
1940s French films